Agil Salim oglu Gurbanov (born 15 August 1986) was a deputy for the Minister of Defense of the Republic of Azerbaijan, for military and technical equipment.

Early life and education 
Agil Salim oglu Gurbanov was born on August 15, 1986 in Baku. In 2004–2008, he studied at the Presidential Academy of Public Administration. In 2012–2014, he studied at the London School of Economics and Political Science.

He is married and has two children.

Career 
In 2015–2019, he was the director of investments at "PASHA Holding" LLC.

Later, he worked as the Chairman of the Supervisory Board of "Sumgait Technologies Park".

By the Decree of the President of the Republic of Azerbaijan Ilham Aliyev on 9 December 2022, he was appointed as the Deputy Minister of Defense for Military and Technical Equipment.

References 

1986 births
Living people